Cathedral is a 1981 novel by American author Nelson DeMille. The novel involves the seizing of St. Patrick's Cathedral by members of the Irish Republican Army on St. Patrick's Day.

References

External links
 Cathedral on Nelson DeMille's Official Website

1981 American novels
Novels by Nelson DeMille
Novels set in New York City
Cathedrals in fiction